This is a list of members of the Australian Senate from 1904 to 1906. Half of its members were elected at the March 1901 election and had terms deemed to start on 1 January 1901 and finishing on 31 December 1906; the other half were elected at the 16 December 1903 election and had terms starting on 1 January 1904 and finishing on 30 June 1910, extended as a result of the 1906 referendum, which changed Senate terms to finish on 30 June, rather than 31 December. Parties reflect those acknowledged at the time of the 1904 election

Notes

References

Members of Australian parliaments by term
20th-century Australian politicians
Australian Senate lists